John F. Regni (born January 19, 1952) is a retired United States Air Force lieutenant general who served as the 17th Superintendent of the United States Air Force Academy from 2005 to 2009.

Education and training
Regni graduated from the United States Air Force Academy in 1973 with a Bachelor of Science in biology. He also holds a master's degree in systems management from St. Mary's University, Texas.
1973 Bachelor of Science degree in biology, United States Air Force Academy, Colorado Springs, Colo.
1977 Squadron Officer School, by correspondence
1981 Master of Science degree in systems management, St. Mary's University, San Antonio, Texas
1984 Air Command and Staff College, Maxwell AFB, Ala.
1990 Air War College, Maxwell AFB, Ala.
1993 Advanced Management Program, University of Illinois
1997 Capstone, National Defense University, Fort Lesley J. McNair, Washington, D.C.He is a graduate of the Air Force Squadron Officer School, the Air Command and Staff College, and the Air War College.

Military career
Regni's career encompassed a wide range of personnel, training and command assignments. His command tours included Base Commander and 8th Combat Support Group Commander, Kunsan Air Base, South Korea; Commander, Second Air Force; and Commander, Air University. He also served as Director of Manpower, Personnel and Support for United States Pacific Command; Director of Personnel at Air Mobility Command; and Director of Military Personnel Policy at United States Air Force Headquarters. He was appointed Superintendent in October 2005, only the second non-aeronautically rated officer to hold the position in the academy's history. Regni passed on the position of Superintendent to Lieutenant General Michael C. Gould in June 2009, and retired from the Air Force on 1 July 2009.

Assignments
November 1973 – July 1976, personnel officer, Ogden Air Logistics Center, Hill AFB, Utah
July 1976 – July 1978, Chief of Personnel Utilization, 40th Tactical Group, Aviano Air Base, Italy
July 1978 – July 1981, Chief, Force Analysis, and assistant, colonel assignments, Air Force Manpower and Personnel Center, Randolph AFB, Texas
July 1981 – August 1983, assistant executive, Deputy Chief of Staff for Manpower and Personnel, Headquarters U.S. Air Force, Washington, D.C.
August 1983 – May 1984, student, Air Command and Staff College, Maxwell AFB, Alabama
May 1984 – July 1987, assistant Chief of Staff, Headquarters Air Training Command, Randolph AFB, Texas
July 1987 – August 1989, Deputy Base Commander, 3380th Air Base Group, Keesler AFB, Mississippi
August 1989 – July 1990, student, Air War College, Maxwell AFB, Alabama
July 1990 – July 1991, Base Commander and Commander, 8th Combat Support Group, Kunsan Air Base, South Korea
July 1991 – August 1994, Director, Manpower, Personnel and Support, Headquarters U.S. Pacific Command, Camp H.M. Smith, Hawaii
August 1994 – March 1996, Director of Personnel, Headquarters Air Mobility Command, Scott AFB, Illinois
March 1996 – June 1998, Director, Military Personnel Policy, Deputy Chief of Staff for Personnel, Headquarters U.S. Air Force, Washington, D.C.
July 1998 – August 2000, Director of Personnel Resources, Deputy Chief of Staff for Personnel, Headquarters U.S. Air Force, and Director, Air Force Personnel Operations Agency, Washington, D.C.
August 2000 – July 2004, Commander, 2nd Air Force, Keesler AFB, Mississippi
July 2004 – October 2005, Commander, Air University, Maxwell AFB, Alabama
October 2005 – June 2009, Superintendent, United States Air Force Academy, Colorado Springs, Colorado

Awards and decorations
Regni's military decorations include the Air Force Distinguished Service Medal with two oak leaf clusters, the Defense Superior Service Medal, the Legion of Merit, the Meritorious Service Medal with silver oak leaf cluster, and the Air Force Commendation Medal.

References

External links

Living people
United States Air Force Academy alumni
Superintendents of the United States Air Force Academy
United States Air Force generals
Recipients of the Air Force Distinguished Service Medal
Recipients of the Legion of Merit
1952 births
Recipients of the Defense Superior Service Medal